Sebastiania longispicata is a species of flowering plant in the family Euphorbiaceae. It was described in 1912. It is native to Paraguay.

References

Plants described in 1912
Flora of Paraguay
longispicata